Ben Wigmore (born 17 January 1982) is an Australian baseball player. He played for the Kensington Cardinals.

In 2004, he was part of the Australian Olympic baseball team, and achieved a Silver Medal in the baseball tournament at the Athens Olympics.

References

External links

1982 births
Living people
Adelaide Bite players
Australian baseball players
Baseball catchers
Baseball players at the 2004 Summer Olympics
Medalists at the 2004 Summer Olympics
Olympic baseball players of Australia
Olympic medalists in baseball
Olympic silver medalists for Australia
Sportspeople from Adelaide